Ardisia premontana is a species of plant in the family Primulaceae. It is found in Ecuador and Peru.

References

premontana
Vulnerable plants
Taxonomy articles created by Polbot